Sing and Be Happy is a 1937 American comedy film directed by James Tinling and written by Lou Breslow, Ben Markson and John Patrick. The film stars Tony Martin, Leah Ray, Joan Davis, Helen Westley, Allan Lane and Dixie Dunbar. The film was released on June 25, 1937, by 20th Century Fox.

Plot

Cast   
Tony Martin as Buzz Mason
Leah Ray as Ann Lane
Joan Davis as Myrtle
Helen Westley as Mrs. Henty
Allan Lane as Hamilton Howe
Dixie Dunbar as Della Dunn
Chick Chandler as Mike
Berton Churchill as John Mason
Andrew Tombes as Thomas Lane
Luis Alberni as Posini
Frank McGlynn, Sr. as Sheriff
Edward Cooper as Mason's Butler

References

External links 
 

1937 films
20th Century Fox films
American comedy films
1937 comedy films
Films directed by James Tinling
American black-and-white films
1930s English-language films
1930s American films